Stephen Hawking's Universe is an astronomical documentary from 1997 made for the Public Broadcasting Service featuring the theoretical physicist Stephen Hawking. The six-episode series discusses the history of astronomy as well as black holes and dark matter.

Brief 
 Seeing is Believing
 The Big Bang
 Cosmic Alchemy
 On the Dark Side
 Black Holes and Beyond
 An Answer to Everything

An extensive online companion site was produced to accompany the documentary. The online companion covers history of cosmology, unanswered questions and other topics related to the program. It was designed to function as both a supplement to the series and a stand-alone web piece. Along with details explaining terminology, different models of the universe, biographies of famous historical figures in cosmology and content derived from the program, the web companion included discussions by contemporary cosmologists of "unsolved mysteries", an opportunity to ask questions, as well as suggestions for experiments.

See also 
 Into The Universe with Stephen Hawking, a 2010 documentary mini-series
 Stephen Hawking's Universe, a book written by John Boslough, published in June 1989, an introduction to the most remarkable scientist of our time.
 Stephen Hawking's Universe: The Cosmos Explained, a paperback book written by David Filkin, published in October 1998, presents the frontiers of scientific knowledge about the basis of our existence & of everything around us.

External links 
 Program homepage
 

1997 American television series debuts
1997 American television series endings
1997 British television series debuts
1997 British television series endings
Documentary television series about astronomy
PBS original programming
1990s American documentary television series
1990s British documentary television series
Cultural depictions of Stephen Hawking